Vriskaaaj! is the second album by Atomik Harmonik.

Track listing
"Zavriskaj na ves glas" - 3:39
"Goveja župca" - 3:36
"Toni je pa ribo ujel" - 3:31
"Kdo trka?" - 3:35
"Repete polka mix" - 7:13
"Ena ni nobena" - 3:10
"Polkaholik (Apres Ski Mix)" - 2:59
"V dolini tihi" - 3:00
"Zavriskaj na ves glas (Balentino Enzyani rmx)" - 3:30
"Polkaholik (DJ Rumek rmx)" - 3:30
"Extra Bonus: Marinka na seniku brizga!!" - 5:02
"Kdo trka? (Video)"
"Zavriskaj na ves glas (Video)"

Atomik Harmonik albums
2006 albums